The Mississippi Valley State Delta Devils and Devilettes (also MVSU and Mississippi Valley) represent Mississippi Valley State University in Itta Bena, Mississippi in intercollegiate athletics. They field thirteen teams including men and women's basketball, cross country, golf, and track and field; women's-only soccer, softball, and volleyball; and men's-only baseball and football. The Delta Devils and Devilettes compete in NCAA Division I and are members of the Southwestern Athletic Conference.

Teams

References

External links